Qal'acha is a village in Sughd Region, northern Tajikistan. It is part of the jamoat Ovchi Kalacha in Ghafurov District.

Notes

References

Populated places in Sughd Region